The Legends are a Tejano "supergroup" of senior Tejano musicians. Members are Carlos Guzmán, Freddie Martínez Sr., Sunny Ozuna, and Augustín Ramírez. The group's first album ¿Qué Es Música Tejana? (2000) won a Latin Grammy Award as Best Tejano Album in 2001, and the group were nominated again at Latin Grammy Awards of 2007 for Otra Vez Raices (2006).

Discography
Albums
¿Qué Es Música Tejana?  2000 
 Dos De Coleccion 2005
 Otra Vez Raices 2006

References

American musical groups
Tejano music groups
Supergroups (music)